Arundinaria tecta, or switchcane, is a bamboo species native to the Southeast United States, first studied in 1813.   It serves as host to several butterfly species. The species typically occurs in palustrine wetlands, swamps, small to medium blackwater rivers, on deep peat in pocosins, and in small seepages with organic soils. The species is only known to occur in the Atlantic Plain, Gulf Coastal Plain, and Mississippi Embayment, though it was earlier though to exist in the Piedmont and Southern Appalachians as well. Specimens from the uplands are now thought to be a separate but morphologically similar species, Arundinaria appalachiana.

Description

Arundinaria tecta features long primary branches usually greater than 50 cm in length. Both leaf surfaces are densely pubescent. The midculm leaves of Arundinaria tecta are longer than their associated internodes. The panicles are borne on shoots that grow directly from the rhizomes. Rhizomes feature continuous air canals. Each panicle has a few clustered spikelets on slender branches. These branches have loose sheaths with minute leaves.

The plant flowers from March to June. Flowering can be stimulated by fire.

References

Bambusoideae
Plants described in 1813